Antonio "Toni" Velamazán Tejedor (born 22 January 1977) is a Spanish retired footballer who played as an attacking midfielder.

He spent most of his professional career with Espanyol, appearing in 141 official games over the course of seven La Liga seasons. He started playing with Barcelona.

Club career
Born in Barcelona, Catalonia, Velamazán was a youth graduate of FC Barcelona. He appeared 11 times for the first team during the 1995–96 season, under Johan Cruyff, but could never establish fully in the main squad, going on to have one-year spells with Real Oviedo, Albacete Balompié and CF Extremadura.

Incidentally, Velamazán would settle with Barça neighbours RCD Espanyol, where he played for six 1/2 years, although he started regularly in only two. His best season would be 1999–2000, as the player scored six goals in 34 matches and the club also won the Copa del Rey – only ranking 14th in the league however; after suffering a knee injury on 6 January 2002 against Málaga CF, he never fully recovered and eventually left the Estadi Olímpic Lluís Companys in late December 2005.

In January 2006, Velamazán returned to the second division as he signed for UD Almería for one year, after which he returned to his region, joining lowly CE L'Hospitalet and remaining there until his retirement at the end of the 2010–11 campaign, aged 34.

International career
Velamazán played and started all six matches (although only one complete) at the 2000 Summer Olympics, scoring once as the Spanish team finished second.

Honours

Club
Espanyol
Copa del Rey: 1999–2000

International
Spain U23
Summer Olympic silver medal: 2000

References

External links

1977 births
Living people
Footballers from Barcelona
Spanish footballers
Association football midfielders
La Liga players
Segunda División players
Segunda División B players
Tercera División players
CF Damm players
FC Barcelona Atlètic players
FC Barcelona players
Real Oviedo players
Albacete Balompié players
CF Extremadura footballers
RCD Espanyol footballers
UD Almería players
CE L'Hospitalet players
Spain youth international footballers
Spain under-21 international footballers
Spain under-23 international footballers
Olympic footballers of Spain
Olympic silver medalists for Spain
Footballers at the 2000 Summer Olympics
Olympic medalists in football
Medalists at the 2000 Summer Olympics
Catalonia international footballers